Devarkandanallur  is a village in the Kudavasal taluk of Tiruvarur district in Tamil Nadu, India.

Demographics 

 census, Devarkandanallur had a population of 1,844 with 879 males and 965 females. The sex ratio was 1098. The literacy rate was 76.28.
It is located on the main highway connecting Tiruvarur and Mannargudi. The railway station nearer to this village is Kulikarai, which comes under Tiruvarur-Tanjore line. Only passenger trains will stop at Kulikarai. Frequent bus facility is available from Tiruvarur and Mannargudi.

References 

 

Villages in Tiruvarur district